Sedreh (also called sudreh, sudre or sudra) is the Avestan term for the undergarment worn by Zoroastrians, which is worn alongside the Kushti.

The Sudreh contains a small pocket in the front, which doesn't open, which is supposed to collect one's good deeds. It is worn to protect the wearer from evil acts. It is considered a spiritual shield from evil.

See also
 Temple garment, a Mormon undergarment
 Kacchera, a Sikh undergarment

References

Zoroastrian rituals
Zoroastrianism in Iran